John Andrew Budd (born 18 April 1950) is a former Australian politician.

He was born at Coventry in England and worked as an adviser to David Beddall, the federal Minister for Small Business and Customs. In 1992 he was elected to the Queensland Legislative Assembly as the Labor member for Redlands. He served until his defeat by a National Party candidate in 1995.

References

1950 births
Living people
Members of the Queensland Legislative Assembly
Australian Labor Party members of the Parliament of Queensland